Joachim Ekanga-Ehawa (born 7 October 1977) is a Cameroonian-French former professional basketball player.

Professional career
During his professional career, Ekanga-Ehawa played with ÉS Chalon-sur-Saône in the French 1st Division. He was the French 2nd Division French Player's MVP in 2007.

National team career
Ekanga-Ehawa was  member of the senior Cameroonian national basketball team. He first represented his country in 2003. In 2007, he won a silver medal at the FIBA Africa Championship.

References

External links
LNB profile 

1977 births
Living people
Cameroonian men's basketball players
Cameroonian expatriates in France
Nanterre 92 players
Metropolitans 92 players
Basketball players from Yaoundé
Shooting guards
Small forwards
French men's basketball players